Book collecting is the collecting of books, including seeking, locating, acquiring, organizing, cataloging, displaying, storing, and maintaining whatever books are of interest to a given collector. The love of books is bibliophilia, and someone who loves to read, admire, and a person who collects books is often called a bibliophile but can also be known as an bibliolater, meaning being overly devoted to books, or a bookman which is another term for a person who has a love of books.

Book collecting can be easy and inexpensive: there are millions of new and used books which are available in brick and mortar bookstores as well as online bookstores. Large book sellers include AbeBooks, Alibris, Amazon, and Biblio.com, and there are independent booksellers that can be found online by searching key words such as: books, books for sale, bookseller, bookstore, rare books, collectibles, etc.

Books traditionally were only printed on paper and then pages were bound together; however, in the past decade or so, books are also available in audio format through websites such as Audible, Google Audiobooks, Librivox, Kobo Audiobooks, and Downpour. Users of these sites can purchase a large library of books that they can access at any time using a phone, tablet, or computer. Just like hard copy books, audio books can be accumulated over many years.

Wealthy book collectors pursue rarities such as the Gutenberg Bible and Shakespeare's First Folio, books which are both famous and extremely valuable. Collectors of lesser means may collect works by a favorite author, first editions of modern authors, or books of a certain genre. Book prices generally depend on the demand for a given edition which is based on factors such as the number of copies available, the book's  condition, and if they were signed by the author (and/or editor or illustrator, if applicable) or by a famous previous owner. For example, a first edition “And To Think That I Saw It On Mulberry Street” can reach the price of $12,000 in the best condition. Some collectors join associations such as The Fine Press Book Association, which is aimed at collectors of modern fine printing. The Private Libraries Association also covers modern fine printing, but is much more general in its outlook.

History of book collecting
In the ancient world, papyri and scrolls (the precursors of the book in codex form) were collected by both institutions and private individuals. In surviving accounts there are references to bibliophile book collectors in that era. Xenophon wrote disparagingly of a man who tried to collect more books than his friends. Seneca the Younger was skeptical of those who collect books they do not read, asking: "What is the use of possessing numberless books and libraries, whose titles their owner can hardly read through in a lifetime?" Book collectors in western antiquity prized accurate transcription and high-quality materials.

In 1344 the English bishop Richard de Bury wrote The Philobiblon, in which he praised the love and appreciation of books. Philip the Good brought together a collection of "about six hundred manuscripts in his possession at the height of his reign", which was the largest private collection of his day.

With the advent of the printing press invented by Johannes Gutenberg in the 15th century, which resulted in cheaper and more abundant books, and with the contemporaneous economic, social and political changes of the Renaissance, book collecting received a great impetus. Jean Grolier, the Treasurer-General of France, was an important bibliophile and book collector of this period. Grolier owned a library of 3,000 volumes and was known for his love of the Latin classics and of richly decorated bookbindings. He was a patron of the Aldine Press that had been founded by the prominent Renaissance printer, typographer, editor and publisher Aldus Manutius the Elder.

During the Reformation many monastic libraries were broken up, and their contents often destroyed. There was an English antiquarian reaction to Henry VIII's dissolution of the monasteries. The commissioners of Edward VI plundered and stripped university, college, and monastic libraries; so to save books from being destroyed, those who could, such as Archbishop Matthew Parker and Sir Robert Cotton, began to collect them.

By the late 17th century, millions of printed books were in circulation and auctions devoted to books began to occur and printed catalogues devoted to books began to be issued by book dealers and by auction houses in Europe and America, leading to a growing popularity of book collecting with the increasingly literate public.

With the advent of the Romantic era in the 18th century and its focus on the past, book collectors began to show an interest in old books, antiquarian editions and manuscripts. This new emphasis was nourished by the flood of old books onto the market following the dissolution of monastic and aristocratic libraries during the French Revolution and the Napoleonic Wars.

The British Whig politician George John, 2nd Earl Spencer (1758-1834) collected tens of thousands of volumes. Strengths of his collection included first editions of the classics; works produced by important early presses, and notably an almost complete collection of Aldine editions; and many Bibles. In 1812 he founded the bibliophilic Roxburghe Club.

Sir Thomas Phillipps (1792-1872) collected 40,000 printed books and 60,000 manuscripts. He was "the greatest collector of manuscript material the world has ever known". His zealous collecting efforts, which were termed bibliomania by Thomas Frognall Dibdin, resulted in the preservation of much historical material, particularly manuscripts, that would otherwise have been destroyed.

The increasingly wealthy United States during the 19th century saw the appearance of "titan" book collectors such as the railroad magnate Henry Huntington and the financier and banker J. Pierpont Morgan.

Well-known book collectors of the 20th century included Eric Quayle (children's books), Henry Wellcome (history of medicine) and Michael Sadleir (Victorian fiction).

Prices
Book prices generally depend on the demand for a given book, the number of copies available for purchase, and the condition of a given copy. As with other collectibles, prices rise and fall with the popularity of a given author, title, or subject.

Because of the huge number of books for sale and the constantly changing marketplace of editions available, there is no single comprehensive price guide for collectible books. The prices of the copies listed for sale at the online bookseller sites provide some indication of their current market values.

The Rothschild Prayerbook sold for $13.6 million while the St Cuthbert Gospel sold for $14.7 million. Both of these religious texts were sold in 2012. The Northumberland Bestiary sold for $20 million in 2007. The New Book of Tang sold for $17.1 million in 2018. William Shakespeare’s First Folio, printed in 1623, sold for $9.978 million in 2020. An Action Comics #1 issue sold for a record $3.2 million in 2014 with a cover price of 10 cents.

Condition

As with other collectibles, the value of a book ultimately depends on its physical condition. Years of handling, moving, and storage take their toll on the dust jacket, cover, pages, and binding. Books are subject to damage from sunlight, moisture, and insects. Acid from the paper making process can cause the pages to develop brown spots, called foxing; gradually turn brown, called tanning; and ultimately crumble.  Despite appearing in many films and other popular culture, wearing cotton gloves while handling old or rare books does not protect the book, and can increase the risk of inadvertent damage.  However, the theatrical effect of showing a rare book being handled with gloved hands may increase its selling price.

Common defects include general wear; jacket/cover edge wear, scratches, and tears; the previous owner's written name, bookplate, or label; soil and stains; dogeared pages; underlining, highlighting, and marginalia; water damage; torn hinges, endpapers and pages; and pages, illustrations, or whole signatures free of the binding, or missing entirely.

A book in good condition should be a rectangular solid when at rest, whether upright or on its back, with the covers at right angles to the spine. If a book is out of square, usually from resting crooked on a shelf, or leans to the right or left when on its back, it is cocked, or shelf-cocked. If the covers bend in or flare out, usually from rapid humidity changes, a book is bowed (bent like a drawn bow). Thick hardbound books also tend to have their pages sag downward in the middle even if they are sitting level on a shelf.

Sources
New books are readily available from bookstores and online.

Out-of-print, used, antiquarian, rare and collectible books are available in specialty bookstores both in person and online. Large online booksellers such as Abebooks, Alibris, Amazon, and Biblio, list inventory from other stores and collectors (charging them a monthly fee and commission charges). Smaller online rare book stores can be found by doing a general search engine inquiry using keywords such as: rare books, collectible books, rare collectibles, out of print books for sales. Antique and collectible stores may have books for sale as well. Major auction houses auction off rare and collectible books; some local auction houses sell rare books by the carton. Other sources can include estate, yard, garage, or rummage sales; and charity fund-raisers.

Antiquarian book collecting
Antiquarian book collecting may be roughly defined as an interest in books printed prior to 1900 and can encompass interest in 19th, 18th, 17th, 16th, and 15th-century books. Antiquarian book collectors are not exclusively interested in first editions and first printings, although they can be. European books created before 1455 are all hand-written and are therefore one-of-a-kind historical artifacts in which the idea of "edition" and "printing" is irrelevant. Any book printed up to the year 1501 is known as an incunable or incunabulum. Such books command a premium and are particularly sought after by collectors interested in the history of printing. There is also an interest among antiquarians for books beautifully made with fine bindings and high quality paper. For many books printed before about 1770, the first edition is not always obtainable, either because of price and/or availability. Later editions/printings from an era of interest are still often desirable to the antiquarian collector as they are also artifacts.

 For example, a first edition of Paradise Lost (1667) by John Milton can fetch equivalent to a down payment on a house. However, the first illustrated folio edition of 1688, technically a later edition, is worth a fraction of the first edition, but still fetches in the thousands of dollars as an illustrated book from the era in which Milton lived.

There were many editions of Alexander Pope's translation of The Iliad and The Odyssey. The first edition of 1715-1720 is worth a small fortune whereas slightly later 18th-century editions are a lot less expensive but still garner premium prices. The John Ogilby 17th-century translations of Homer's The Iliad and The Odyssey garner hefty prices, but not as much as the first edition of the Pope translation. This may be in part due to a significant number of copies of Ogilby's first edition that probably perished in the Great Fire of London of 1666.

The first English movable-type printer was Caxton in the late 15th century. Editions of his books from the 15th century are very rare. 
Occasionally, 16th-century editions similar to Caxton's books appear among antiquarian book dealers and auctions, often fetching very high prices. The last Shakespeare First Folio of 1623 (first edition of the collected works of William Shakespeare) garnered a record-breaking $9,978,000 at Christie's in October 2020. Later 17th-century folios of William Shakespeare's works can still fetch about the price of a small house but are more readily available and relatively obtainable, whereas almost all extant copies of the First Folio are owned by libraries, museums or universities and thus are unlikely to appear on the market. For the antiquarian collector, how a particular book's production fits into a larger historical context can be as important as the edition, even if it may not be a first edition.

Also of interest are books previously owned by famous persons, or personages of high stature, such as someone from royalty or the nobility. Tracing the history of an antiquarian book's possession history, referred to as "provenance", can markedly affect the value of a copy, even if it is not desirable per se. For example, a copy of a less-important 18th-century book known to have been owned by Voltaire would achieve a value many times its stand-alone market value, simply because it was once in Voltaire's possession. Previous owners of books often signed their copies or labelled them with bookplates, and it is often not difficult to identify a prominent previous owner if the provenance is well documented. Books owned by well-known individuals that also have a connection with the author (often as a gift from the author with a written dedication to the recipient) are known as association copies.

The American School Library is an example of a very rare multi-volume boxed set with works by many popular or famous authors. Apparently the only extant full set is owned by the Smithsonian Institution's National Museum of American History.

Prominent book collectors 
* 

 John Roland Abbey
 John Quincy Adams
 Darren Ashcroft
 Clifton Waller Barrett
 Chester Beatty
 William Thomas Beckford
 Martin Bodmer
 The Book Club of Detroit
 John Carter Brown
 Boudewijn Büch
 Anthony Collins
 George Cosmatos
 Robert Bruce Cotton
 Jules Desnoyers
 Joseph W. Drexel
 Alexandre Dumas, père
 Umberto Eco
 John Evelyn
 DeCoursey Fales
 Ian Fleming 
 Henry Clay Folger
 R. B. Freeman
 George III
 Edward Gibbon
 Stephen Jay Gould
 Robert Harley, Earl of Oxford
 Rush Hawkins
 Richard Heber
 Henry II of France
 Harrison D. Horblit
 Arthur A. Houghton, Jr.
 Henry E. Huntington
 Thomas Jefferson
 Jerome Kern
 Geoffrey Keynes
 John Maynard Keynes
 Aleksey Khludov
 George Frederick Kunz
 Mark Lanier
 Robert Lenkiewicz
 Wilmarth Sheldon Lewis
 Josiah K. Lilly, Jr.
 Frederick Locker-Lampson
 Antonio Magliabechi
 Alberto Manguel
 H. Bradley Martin
 Larry McMurtry
 Wolfgang Menzel
 Dewitt Miller
 David Scott Mitchell
 Michel de Montaigne
 J. Pierpont Morgan
 William Morris
 Christoph Gottlieb von Murr
 A. Edward Newton
 Friedrich Nietzsche
 Charles Nodier
 William Osler
 Samuel Pepys
 Charles Dyson Perrins
 Sir Thomas Phillipps
 Francis Place
 Abraham Rosenbach
 Lessing J. Rosenwald
 Ellen G. K. Ruben
 Joaquín Rubio y Muñoz
 Arturo Alfonso Schomburg
 Martin Schoyen
 John MacKay Shaw
 Frederick Skiff
 Adam Smith
 Walter W. Stone
 Thomas W. Streeter
 Levinus Warner
 Andrew Dickson White
 John Griswold White
 Harry Elkins Widener

Book collecting in China
The history of book collecting in China dates back over two millennia. An important effort to collect books in China was made during the early Han dynasty by the government, as many important books were burned during the Qin dynasty. From then on, book collecting began to flourish in China, particularly after the invention of block printing during the early Tang dynasty, with both imperial and private collections blooming throughout the country. However, the systematic study of book collecting began only during the Qing dynasty.

Terminology
Cangshulou ( "book collecting tower"): library, such as the private Tianyi Chamber (天一閣), the oldest existing library in China, or the imperial Wenyuan Chamber (文淵閣), where the works collected in Siku Quanshu were reposited
Jinxiangben (巾箱本 "headscarf box edition"): ancient pocket edition
Jiupingzhuang (舊平裝 "old paperback") or Jiushu (舊書 "old books"): old books published after 1911, when the Qing dynasty was overthrown
Maobianben (毛邊本 "hairy-side edition"): uncut editions
Songben (宋本 "Song edition") or Songban (宋版 "Song edition"): block printed books published during the Song dynasty, highly valued by collectors
Xianzhuangshu (線裝書 "thread-bound book"): thread-bound books, usually referred to those published before 1911

Virtual book collecting
Virtual book collecting can be described as collecting books in a digital format (virtually) on a computer or other electronic device. A bibliophile may acquire ebooks by downloading them or copying from borrowed media, such as CDs and DVDs. However, this may violate copyright law, depending on the license under which the ebook was released. Ebooks acquired from Project Gutenberg and many similar free collections cause no violation as they have gone out of copyright, have been released under a Creative Commons license, or else are in the public domain.

See also 
 Book*
 The Book Collector
 Book Collectors Society of Australia
 Book design
 Bookbinding
 Bookplate
 Collectables
 Fellowship of American Bibliophilic Societies
 Imprint
 Manuscript
 Private library
 Tape trading
 Text (disambiguation)

References

Works cited

Further reading
Ahearn, Allen and Patricia. Book Collecting: A Comprehensive Guide. New York: Putnam, 1995. .
Ahearn, Allen and Patricia. Collected Books: The Guide to Values. New York: Putnam, 2001. .
American Book Prices Current (annual, 1894/1895 onwards)
Bernard, Philippa, Leo Bernard and Angus O'Neill, eds. Antiquarian Books: A Companion for Booksellers, Librarians and Collectors. Aldershot, Hants., Scolar Press, 1994.
Brown, James Duff. The Small Library: A Guide to the Collection and Care of Books. London & New York: Routledge, 1907.
Carter, John. ABC for Book Collectors. 8th ed. edited by Nicolas Barker. New Castle, DE: Oak Knoll; London: British Library, 2004.  (British Library),  (Oak Knoll).  (a classic, first published in 1952).
Carter, John. New Paths in Book-Collecting: Essays by Various Hands. London: Constable & Co.; New York: Charles Scribner's Sons, 1934; reprinted Freeport, N.Y.: Books for Libraries, 1967.
Carter, John. Taste and Technique in Book-collecting, with an Epilogue. Pinner, Middlesex: Private Libraries Association, 1970 (The Sandars Lectures in Bibliography, 1947). .
Cella, Bernhard. Collecting Books: A selection of recent Art and Artists' Books produced in Austria
Chidley, John. Discovering Book Collecting. Shire Publications, 1982; 2nd ed., 2004.
Connolly, Joseph. Collecting Modern First Editions (1977).
Franklin, Ralph. 1974. “Conjectures on Rarity.” Library Quarterly 44 (October): 309–21.
Greenfield, Jane. The Care of Fine Books. New York: Lyons & Burford, 1988. .
W. C. Hazlitt: The Book Collector: A general survey of the pursuit and of those who have engaged in it at home and abroad from the earliest period to the present ... . London: J. Grant, 1904 (published over a century ago, but still worth dipping into).
Hofer, Philip, Ray Nash, Harold Hugo, and Roderick Stinehour. 1968. Philip Hofer as author and publisher. [Cambridge, Mass.]: Harvard College Library, Department of Printing & Graphic Arts. 
Jensen, Kristian. Revolution and the Antiquarian Book: Reshaping the Past, 1780-1815. Cambridge: Cambridge University Press, 2011. .
McBride, Bill. Book Collecting for Fun and Profit. Hartford, CT: McBride/Publisher, 1997. .
McBride, Bill. A Pocket Guide to the Identification of First Editions. Sixth ed. Hartford, CT: McBride/Publisher, 2000. .
McBride, Bill. Points of Issue. Third ed. [Hartford, CT]: McBride/Publisher, 1996. .
McKitterick, David. The Invention of Rare Books: Private Interest and Public Memory, 1600-1840. Cambridge, United Kingdom: Cambridge University Press. 2018.
Miller, Stephen. Book Collecting: A Guide to Antiquarian and Secondhand Books. Royston, Hertfordshire, Provincial Book Fairs Association, 1994.
Peters, Jean (Editor). Book Collecting: A Modern Guide. New York and London: R.R. Bowker and Company, 1977. .
Peters, Jean, ed. Collectible Books: Some New Paths. New York and London: R. R. Bowker, 1979. .
Quayle, Eric. A Collector's Book of Books. New York: Clarkson N. Potter, Inc., 1971; London: Studio Vista, 1971.
Rees-Mogg, William . How to Buy Rare Books: A Practical Guide to the Antiquarian Book Market. Oxford: Phaidon, 1985 (Christie's collectors guides) .
Rota, Anthony. Apart from the Text. Pinner, Middlesex: Private Libraries Association, 1998. .
Rota, Anthony. Books in the Blood. Pinner, Middlesex: Private Libraries Association, 2002. .
Russell, R.B. Guide to First Edition Prices, Eighth Edition. North Yorkshire: Tartarus Press, 2010. .
Stitz, Charles (editor) (2010). Australian Book Collectors. Bendigo, Victoria: Bread Street Press. .
Uden, Grant. Understanding Book-Collecting. Woodbridge, Antique Collectors' Club, 1988.
Wilson, Robert A. Modern Book Collecting. New York: Lyons & Burford, 1992. .
Zempel, Edward N. and Verkler, Linda (Editors). First Editions: A Guide to Identification. Fourth ed. Peoria, IL: The Spoon River Press, 2001. .
Forbes article on book collecting by Finn-Olaf Jones, December 12, 2005.

For more modern accounts, see the series of books on book-collectors, book-collecting and "bibliomania" by Nicholas A. Basbanes:
A Gentle Madness: Bibliophiles, Bibliomanes, and the Eternal Passion for Books. New York: Holt, 1999. .
Patience & Fortitude: A Roving Chronicle of Book People, Book Places, and Book Culture. New York: HarperCollins, 2001. .
Among the Gently Mad: Perspectives and Strategies for the Book Hunter in the 21st Century. New York: Holt, 2002. .
A Splendor of Letters: The Permanence of Books in an Impermanent World. New York: HarperCollins, 2003. .
Every Book Its Reader: The Power of the Printed Word to Stir the World. New York: HarperCollins, 2005. .

Follow husband and wife team Lawrence & Nancy Goldstone as they search for rare and collectible volumes, and explore real mysteries in the rare-book world, in:
Used And Rare: Travels In The Book World. New York: St. Martin's Press, 1997. .
Slightly Chipped: Footnotes in Booklore. New York: St. Martin's Press, 1999. .
Warmly Inscribed: The New England Forger and Other Book Tales. New York: St. Martin's Press, 2001. .
Out of the Flames: The Remarkable Story of a Fearless Scholar, a Fatal Heresy, and One of the Rarest Books in the World. New York: Broadway, 2002. .
The Friar and the Cipher: Roger Bacon and the Unsolved Mystery of the Most Unusual Manuscript in the World. New York: Broadway, 2005. .

For book collecting in China, see:
 傅璇琮、谢灼华主编，《中國藏書通史》，宁波：宁波出版社，2001.
 焦树安，《中囯藏书史话》，北京：商务印书館，1997.
 任繼愈主編，《中國藏書樓》，沈阳：辽宁人民出版社，2001.
 黄燕生，《天祿琳琅：古代藏書和藏書樓 》，台北：萬卷樓圖書有限公司，2000.
 徐凌志主编，《中国历代藏书史》，南昌：江西人民出版社，2004.

External links 

AbeBooks Feature Archives Articles on rare books and collecting, authors, publishers, interesting characters in literature, and notable anniversaries.
Alcuin Society A voluntary association of people who care about the past, present and future of fine books (archived 16 October 2006)
Antiquarian Booksellers Association of America An association of rare book sellers in the United States
Australian and New Zealand Association of Antiquarian Booksellers The official association of rare book sellers in Australia and New Zealand
 The Book Collector Journal founded in 1952, for "bibliophiles, booksellers, librarians and all who are interested in our literary heritage"
Books and Book Collecting Information and resources for book collectors, trussel.com
Biblionews The Journal of The Book Collectors' Society of Australia.
Bookbinding and the Conservation of Books A Dictionary of Descriptive Terminology, by Matt T. Roberts and Don Etherington
Collecting Books and Magazines: Authors and Artists Resource material for collectors of children's books and magazines 
The Conservation of Books and Documents Ten frequently asked questions, National Library of the Netherlands.
Conservation OnLine: Resources for Conservation Professionals A project of the Preservation Department of Stanford University Libraries
Digital Librarian A librarian's choice of the best Web resources for book collectors
Collegiate Book Collecting Championship Annual collegiate book collecting contest, promoting book collecting to the next generation (archived 21 November 2008)
The FinePress Book Association An association of collectors of modern fine press books
Firsts: The Book Collector's Magazine Resource for book collecting, first editions, rare, antiquarian books.
The International League of Antiquarian Booksellers Resources including library of articles, glossary of terms in several languages
Infography about Book Collecting A book collector's choice of the best books, articles, and online resources
Paperback Revolution Essays on paperbacks including Tauchnitz, Albatross, and Penguin Books.
Private Libraries Association A worldwide association of booklovers and collectors
Publishing History Includes book series and lists of titles in series.
Terms of the Trade, Antiquarian Booksellers Association (archived 26 May 2007)
What Are Some Useful Guides to Collecting?, Vintage Paperbacks blog
UBC Asian Library Rare Book Collection – A rich collection of Chinese documents and literature, as well as some rare reproductions of Japanese and Chinese paintings, from the UBC Library Digital Collections